Mathilde Rivas Toft (born 16 April 1997) is a Norwegian handballer who plays for Molde Elite.

She also represented Norway in the 2016 Women's Junior World Handball Championship, placing 5th.

Individual awards  
 All-Star Right Wing of the IHF Junior World Championship: 2016

References
 

 
Norwegian female handball players
1997 births
Living people
Handball players from Oslo